Wydad Serghini is a Moroccan football club currently playing in the third division.

References

Football clubs in Morocco